The Bixby family is an American family that was heavily involved in the development of California ranches and real estate in the 19th and 20th centuries. Through various companies, they controlled at one time or another large swathes of California real estate, much of it derived from Mexican land grants. Over several generations, their holdings included Rancho Los Cerritos and Rancho Los Alamitos, and parts of Rancho San Justo and Rancho Palos Verdes, totaling well over 100,000 acres. Parts of the towns of Long Beach, Bellflower, Paramount, Signal Hill, Lakewood, and Los Alamitos emerged from former Bixby-held lands. Within Long Beach, the neighborhoods Bixby Hill, Bixby Knolls, and Bixby Village are named after the family, as well as Bixby Park in the Alamitos Beach neighborhood.

The key members of the family connected to California real estate are the brothers Llewellyn and Jotham Bixby, their first cousins Thomas and Benjamin Flint, and a cousin of the next generation, John William Bixby. Llewellyn's daughter Sarah Bixby Smith wrote a well-known memoir of growing up on the Bixby family ranches in the late 19th century; her second husband, Paul Jordan-Smith, was also a writer. Jotham's daughter Fanny Bixby Spencer was a philanthropist and anti-war activist who was also one of the nation's earliest policewomen.

Bixby genealogy

(1) Joseph Bixby (1620-1701) born in Suffolk, England, emigrated to Boxford, Mass. before 1638; m. Sarah Herde [9 children]

(13) Benjamin Bixby (1650-1727) born in Ipswitch, Mass.; m. Mary  -- [3 children]; m. Mary -- [8 children]

(134) Samuel Bixby (1689-1741) born in Topsfield, Mass.; m. Martha Underwood [8 children]

(1343) Samuel Bixby (1721-1809) born in Sutton, Mass.; m. Lydia Bond [11 children]

(13436) Solomon Bixby (1761-1835) born in Sutton, Mass.; m. Lucy Taylor [12 children]

(134363) Amasa Bixby (1794-1872) born in Norridgewock, Maine; m. Fanny Weston (1794?-1869); [13 children]
 Llewellyn Bixby (1825-96) m. Mary Hathaway [3 children]
 Sarah Hathaway Bixby (b. 1871) m. Paul Jordan-Smith
 Jotham Bixby (1831-1917) m. Margaret Winslow Hathaway [7 children]
 Fanny Weston Bixby (1879-1930) m. William Carl Spencer (1871-1950)

(134368) Simon Bixby (1803-1862) born in Norridgewock, Maine; m. Deborah Norton Flint (1806-76) [10 children]
 John William Bixby (b. 1848) m. Susan P. Hathaway (d. 1906; sister of Margaret Winslow Hathaway)

See also
Bixby land companies
Los Cerritos Ranch House
Bixby Slough
Bixby Marshland

References

External links
Bixby correspondence, 1867-1923. California State Library, California History Room. 
Harris, Marcia Lee. Fanny Bixby Spencer: Long Beach's Inspirational Firebrand.
Smith, Sarah Bixby. Adobe Days: A Book of California Memories. Los Angeles: J. Zeitlin, 1925. Cedar Rapids, Iowa: Torch Press, 1926 (2nd ed.). Reprinted 1987 by the University of Nebraska Press.
"Finding Aid for the Sarah Bixby Smith correspondence, 1871-1935". Online Archive of California.
Rancho Los Cerritos website

Families from California
Ranchers from California